The 2009 World Judo Juniors Championships was an edition of the World Judo Juniors Championships, organised by the International Judo Federation. It was held in Paris, France from 22 to 25 October 2009.

Medal summary

Men's events

Source Results

Women's events

Source Results

Medal table

References

External links
 

World Judo Junior Championships
World Championships, U21
World Championships, U21
Judo
World
Judo
Judo, World Championships U21